The Pratt & Whitney R-1340 Wasp is an aircraft engine of the reciprocating type that was widely used in American aircraft from the 1920s onward. It was the Pratt & Whitney aircraft company's first engine, and the first of the famed Wasp series. It was a single-row, nine-cylinder, air-cooled, radial design, and displaced 1,344 cubic inches (22 L); bore and stroke were both 5.75 in (146 mm). A total of 34,966 engines were produced.

As well as numerous types of fixed-wing aircraft, it was used to power helicopters, the Agusta-Bell AB.102 and the Sikorsky H-19, and a class of airship, the K-class blimp.

In 2016, it received designation as a Historic Engineering Landmark from the American Society of Mechanical Engineers.

Variants
Note: R for Radial and 1340 for 1340 cubic inch displacement.

R-1340-7 , 
R-1340-8 
R-1340-9 , 
R-1340-16 
R-1340-17 
R-1340-19 
R-1340-19F 
R-1340-21G 
R-1340-22 
R-1340-23 
R-1340-30 
R-1340-31 
R-1340-33 
R-1340-48 
R-1340-49 
R-1340-AN1 , 
R-1340-AN2 , 3:2 geared prop shaft
R-1340-B 
R-1340-D 
R-1340-S1D1
R-1340-S1H1-G, 
R-1340-S3H1
R-1340-T1D1

Applications

Engines on display
 There are a Wasp A and three Wasp C's on display at the New England Air Museum, Bradley International Airport, Windsor Locks, CT.

Specifications (R-1340-S1H1-G)

See also

References

Notes

Bibliography
 Bridgman, Leonard. Jane's All the World's Aircraft 1945-46. Hammersmith, London: HarperCollinsPublishers (1994 reprint).  
Gunston, Bill. World Encyclopedia of Aero Engines: From the Pioneers to the Present Day. 5th edition, Stroud, UK: Sutton, 2006.
White, Graham. Allied Aircraft Piston Engines of World War II: History and Development of Frontline Aircraft Piston Engines Produced by Great Britain and the United States During World War II. Warrendale, Pennsylvania: SAE International, 1995.

External links

"Index of Wasp & R-1340 Designated Engines", a scanned Pratt & Whitney reference document from 1956 detailing the different Wasp versions, their specifications, and the aircraft they were installed in.

There is a "Pratt & Whitney 1340N Radial Engine" in use on a T-6 Texan at Pacific Warbirds, Oahu, HI

Aircraft air-cooled radial piston engines
R-1340
1920s aircraft piston engines